Havana Province was one of the provinces of Cuba, prior to being divided into two new provinces of Artemisa and Mayabeque on January 1, 2011. It had 711,066 people in the 2002 census. The largest city was Artemisa (81,209).

Geography
La Habana Province bordered Pinar del Río, and Matanzas. It had coasts in the south and north and had dozens of towns and a few small cities which rank between the 20 and 40 largest of the island.

Economy
Much of the province's agriculture was geared towards the production of food, primarily cattle, potatoes and fruit. Unlike much of Cuba, sugar and tobacco played only a small role in the province's economy. There was also much industrialization in the province, with numerous electricity plants and sugar mills.

Municipalities

Sources: Population from 2004 Census; Area from 1976 municipal re-adjustment

Demographics
In 2004, the province of La Habana had a population of 722,045.

References

External links

Provincia de La Habana}

 
Former provinces of Cuba
Artemisa Province
Mayabeque Province
1900s establishments in Cuba
2011 disestablishments in Cuba